José Luis Valbuena (born March 19, 1971 in Turmero, Aragua) is a former bantamweight boxer from Venezuela, who had a total number of 30 professional fights during his career. He is best known for knocking down Carlos Barreto on October 9, 1999. Three days after the bout Barreto died due to brain injuries sustained in the match. As an amateur Valbuena represented his native country at the 1995 Pan American Games in Mar del Plata, Argentina.

References
 

1971 births
Living people
People from Turmero
Bantamweight boxers
Boxers at the 1995 Pan American Games
Venezuelan male boxers
Pan American Games competitors for Venezuela